Carolina Power & Light (CP&L), later doing business as Progress Energy Inc., was an electrical generation, transmission, and distribution utility based in Raleigh, North Carolina. The company was founded on July 13, 1908 as the result of the merger and buyout of numerous small, private, and financial distressed utilities across the state. Known locally as "CP&L" the company's main operations were in Eastern North Carolina and in parts of northeastern South Carolina and in the Asheville area of western North Carolina. The company merged with Florida Progress Corporation in 2000 to become Progress Energy Inc.

History 

In 1908, Raleigh Electric, Central Carolina Power and Consumer Light & Power merged to form Carolina Power & Light.

In 1952, CP&L added southeastern North Carolina to its service territory with the acquisition of Tide Water Power, following the death of Hugh MacRae.

In 1987, CP&L placed the Shearon Harris Nuclear Power Plant into service.

In 2002, subsequent to the 2000 acquisition of Florida Progress Corporation, CP&L began doing business as Progress Energy, Inc.  It then distinguished its operations as Progress Energy Carolinas and Progress Energy Florida.

In 2011, Duke Energy acquired Progress Energy. CP&L was renamed Duke Energy Progress.

References

Electric power companies of the United States
Companies based in North Carolina